Kathy Foxworth (born November 4, 1964) is an American former professional tennis player.

Biography
Originally from St. Louis, she is the daughter of boxer Bob Foxworth, who once fought an exhibition bout with Joe Louis.

Foxworth played college tennis for the University of Houston, where she was an NCAA All-American for singles in 1987 and twice earned All-American honors for doubles.

During her career on the professional tour she featured in the women's doubles main draw of the US Open on three occasions and played in the mixed doubles at the 1988 Wimbledon Championships. She had best rankings of 267 in singles and 128 in doubles.

Her brother, Bruce Foxworth, was also a professional tennis player.

ITF finals

Doubles: 20 (11–9)

References

External links
 
 

1964 births
Living people
American female tennis players
Houston Cougars women's tennis players
Tennis players from St. Louis